Pape Ndiaga Dia (born April 20, 1993) is a Senegalese footballer.

Club career

Udinese

Loan moves
In June 2013, Dia joined A.S. Avellino 1912 on loan, but only went on to play twice in Serie B. Dia joined A.C. Pavia for the second half of the season, making 8 appearances for the Lega Pro club.

On September 1, 2014, Dia joined Carpi on loan until the end of the Serie B season.

References

External links
 
 

1993 births
Living people
Senegalese footballers
Udinese Calcio players
U.S. Avellino 1912 players
F.C. Pavia players
A.C. Carpi players
Serie B players
Serie C players
Senegalese expatriate footballers
Expatriate footballers in Italy
Association football wingers